Metropolis is a travel guide documentary television program that explores the culture and history of some of the major metropolitan cities in the world. The six-episode program premiered on January 4, 2015 on the Travel Channel, and aired its final episode on September 24, 2015. Featuring some of the most iconic attractions in the city and its rich culture, it includes guest commentaries by noted celebrities such as Samantha Brown and Andrew Zimmern among others.

Episodes

References

External links
 Metropolis on Travel Channel
 Metropolis on Nutopia

2010s American documentary television series
2015 American television series debuts
2015 American television series endings
Travel Channel original programming